Melody of the World is a 1929 German film directed by Walter Ruttmann. It is also known as World Melody. The film is structured like a symphony and consists of documentary footage from all over the world, contrasted and juxtaposed to show a number of human activities as they take form in different cultures. There are also staged scenes with actors.

The film was produced by Tonbild-Syndikat AG as an assignment from Hapag. It has an original score by Wolfgang Zeller. It was advertised as Germany's first feature-length sound film.

Cast
 Ivan Koval-Samborskij as sailor
 Renée Stobrawa as sailor's wife
 Grace Chiang as Japanese woman
 O. Idris as Malayan temple dancer
 Wilhelm Cuno as general director of Hapag

Release
The world premiere took place on 27 July 1929 at the Deutsches Kammermusikfest in Baden-Baden. The film was released in regular German cinemas on 10 May 1930, distributed by Deutsches Lichtspiel-Syndikat AG.

References

External links
 

1929 films
Films directed by Walter Ruttmann
Films of the Weimar Republic
German documentary films
1920s German-language films
German black-and-white films
1929 documentary films
1920s German films